St James’ Church, Riddings is a Grade II listed parish church in the Church of England in Riddings, Derbyshire.

History
The church was built in 1832 - 1833 by Francis Octavius Bedford, for the Oakes family of Riddings House. Many of the locals were dissenters and would not pay the amount of £200 required by the Bishop of Lichfield and Coventry for his blessing, so its consecration was delayed until 28 June 1834.

The church was restored and enlarged between 1884 and 1885 when the chancel was added. The old pews were taken away and the side galleries taken down. A reredos was given by Mr. R.G. Lomas of Derby. The church was re-opened by the Bishop of Southwell on 8 April 1885.

Parish status
The church is in a joint parish with
Christ Church, Ironville

Organ
A pipe organ was built by Bevington ca. 1850. It was enlarged in 1885 by Charles Lloyd. A specification of the organ can be found on the National Pipe Organ Register.

References

Riddings
Riddings
Churches completed in 1833
Commissioners' church buildings